The Vânători de Munte (English translation: Mountain Huntsmen) are the elite mountain troops of the Romanian Land Forces. They were first established as an independent Army Corps in 1916 during World War I, and  became operational in 1917 under Corpul de Munte designation.

History

Origins and World War I
In 1883, the Mountain Artillery was formed with one battery assigned to each of the four Army Corps. In 1913 and 1915, two divizions of Mountain Artillery were formed, each with 4 batteries. These were further integrated into the 1st Mountain Artillery Regiment in 1916, with the headquarters in Târgu Jiu. Another 8 batteries were added to the Regiment before Romania's entry in the First World War.

Despite several initiatives starting in 1889, the first mountain troops were formed in November 1916. Through Order no. 294, the Military School of Skiing was transformed in the "Corps of Mountain Hunters" (Corpul Vânătorilor de munte). It was organized in three battalions, each with three companies. In January 1917, the Corps was reorganized into the "Mountain Hunter Battalion" (Batalionul Vânătorilor de Munte). It consisted of 5 infantry companies, 2 machine gun companies and a wireless telegraphy section. Each company took a nickname: the 1st was nicknamed Tigrii, the 2nd Șoimii, the 3rd Haiducii, the 4th Leii, and the 5th Pandurii, while the 1st and 2nd machine gun companies were nicknamed Smeii and Balaurii respectively. This tradition was kept until after the Second World War.

The Mountain Hunter Battalion first saw combat during the Third Battle of Oituz. The vânători de munte companies were deployed at Cireșoaia and Coșna, where between 20th and 26th of August they fought against the Württemberg mountain battalion of the German Alpenkorps, winning the engagement. The Germans eventually managed to take the two peaks, but failed to break the Romanain lines further. On 30 October 1917, the Battalion was transformed into a Regiment, and Prince Carol was named as its honorific commander. From March 1919, the Regiment participated in the Hungarian–Romanian War.

Interwar to World War II

In 1923, the first two vânători de munte divisions were formed: the 1st Division at Brașov, and the 2nd Division at Bistrița. The foundations of training, rules and principles of fighting in the mountains were also laid out.

The Romanian vânători de munte saw action in World War II on the Eastern Front in some of the harshest battles — including the sieges of Sevastopol and Stalingrad — where their performance lived up to their reputation: virtually all their commanders from brigade level and up received the Knight's Cross of the Iron Cross, with general Mihail Lascăr being the first foreigner to receive Oak Leaves on 22 November 1942 (see List of foreign recipients of the Knight's Cross). The greatest single achievement of the vânători de munte was the capture of Nalchik on 2 November 1942, the farthest point of the Nazi Germany advance into the Caucasus. This victory earned Romanian Brigadier General Ioan Dumitrache the Knight's Cross of the Iron Cross. After the coup d'état of 23 August 1944, the vânători de munte fought on the Soviet side, notably in the Tatra Mountains.

After the end of the war, one of the first measures taken by the Soviets in occupied Romania was to disband the mountain troops. Shortly after the Soviet occupation troops left Romania in 1958, the vânători de munte were re-established again as a distinct branch of Communist Romania's People's Ground Forces.

There are currently two brigades operational, one subordinated to the 1st Infantry Division (the 2nd Mountain Troops Brigade "Sarmizegetusa"), and another one subordinated to the 4th Infantry Division (the 61st Mountain Troops Brigade "General Virgil Bădulescu"). Mountain troops units participated in the occupation of Iraq and Afghanistan.

Image gallery

See also
 List of mountain warfare forces
 Mountain warfare
 Ski warfare
 French Chasseurs Alpins
 German Gebirgsjäger
 Italian Alpini
 Polish Podhale rifles
 10th Mountain Division (United States)

References

Bibliography

External links

 Presentation of the vânători de munte on the Land Forces' website
 Unofficial page
 "The Mountain Troops"

Romanian Land Forces
Mountain units and formations